Coleophora saltae is a moth of the family Coleophoridae.

References

saltae
Moths described in 1999